O. M. Anujan is a poet, Kathakali scholar, and academic from Kerala, India. He was one of the founding members of International Center for Kathakali, New Delhi. In 2018, he received the Kerala Sahitya Akademi Lifetime Achievement (Samagra sambhavana) Award.

He has written 10 poetry collection, 5 attakathas (texts for Kathakali performance) one short story collection and one travelogue.

Biography 
Anujan was born 20 July 1928, in Vellinezhi Olappamanna Mana in Palakkad district. His mother was from Vadakkancheri Mana. Poet Olappamanna is his elder brother.  Due to lack of study facilities in Vellinezhi that time, he joined the school at Ottapalam at the age of 10 only. His birth name was Chithrabhanu. However, being the youngest of eight siblings, he decided to take the name Anujan (which means younger brother in Malayalam) when he joined the school.  

After passing intermediate from Victoria College, Palakkad, he completed bachelor's degree in Economics from Madras Christian College. After that he studied post graduate degree in Malayalam Literature from the University College, Thiruvananthapuram, and later a doctorate under Sardar KM Panicker.

After retirement he settled in Ernakulam city, and there he became part of Ernakulam Kathakali Club.

Literary contributions

Autobiography 

 Jeevitham Kavyam (Life as Poem)- It is written in second or third person narration style

Poetry collection 

 Srishti
 Vaishakham
 Nagarashilpikal
 Chilluvathil
 Agadhaneelimakal
 Mukulangal
 Megham
 Aaktheyan
 Malayalichi
 Madhuvum Ramayum Rajavum

Attakatas 

 Bhavadevacharithram (Based on Vallathol's Poetry)
 Meghasandesham
 Urvasi Purooravass
 Yayati
 Bharatastreekal than bhavashudhi

Short story collection 

 Kaviyude kadhakal

Travelogue 

 Poorva Europilekku oru samskarika paryadanam

Academic career 
He worked as lecturer in Presidency College, Chennai and then joined as Malayalam professor in Delhi University, later he became head of the Department of Modern Indian Languages, University of Delhi. After retirement  he himself participated in the research and evaluation of doctoral theses by students from various universities.

Awards 

 2018: Kerala Sahitya Akademi Lifetime Achievement Award

References 

Malayalam-language writers
Indian male poets
People from Palakkad district
Recipients of the Kerala Sahitya Akademi Award
1928 births
Possibly living people